Frank Elliott Barber Jr. (June 8, 1912 – January 14, 1992) was a Vermont attorney and politician who served as Vermont Attorney General from 1953 to 1955.

Biography
F. Elliott Barber was born in Brattleboro, Vermont on June 8, 1912.  He was the son of attorney F. Elliott Barber Sr., and the nephew of Herbert G. Barber, who also served as Vermont Attorney General.  He graduated from Brattleboro High School in 1930, Norwich University in 1934, and Harvard Law School in 1937.  He was admitted to the bar in 1937, and practiced with his father in the Brattleboro firm of Barber & Barber.

Barber became active in Republican politics; from 1941 to 1943, he served as Brattleboro’s town counsel.  In 1944, he was a delegate to the Republican National Convention.  During his career, he also held other local offices, including justice of the peace and town meeting moderator.

He joined the United States Army for World War II, and attained the rank of captain at Headquarters, Chinese Combat Command, a unit commanded by Robert B. McClure, which operated in the China Burma India Theater.

In 1946 he won election to the Vermont State Senate, and he served from 1947 to 1949.  In 1947, Barber was appointed judge of Brattleboro’s municipal court, and he served until 1949.  In 1950, he won election to the Vermont House of Representatives, and he served one term, 1951 to 1953.

In 1952, Barber won the Republican nomination for Vermont Attorney General.  He won the general election for the term starting in January 1953.  Attorney General Clifton G. Parker resigned in December, and Governor Lee E. Emerson appointed Barber to fill the vacancy effective December 31.  Barber served from December 31, 1952 to January 1955.  As his deputy, Barber appointed Robert Stafford, who succeeded him as Attorney General.

In 1954, Barber was an unsuccessful candidate for the Republican nomination for Lieutenant Governor of Vermont; the nomination was won by Consuelo N. Bailey, who defeated Barber and Harold J. Arthur, and went on to win the general election.

In 1959, Stafford, now serving as governor, appointed Barber to the Vermont Liquor Control Board.  He served until resigning in 1963.

Barber continued to practice law, and also became a lobbyist.  He remained active in Republican politics; in 1970, he was the Windham County chairman of Senator Winston L. Prouty’s reelection campaign.  In 1976 he was one of several former attorneys general who endorsed Republican candidate John M. Meaker for the position.  (Meaker was defeated by Democratic incumbent M. Jerome Diamond.)

Barber died on June 14, 1992.

Family
In 1947, Barber married to Harriet Frances Fairbrother (d. 1983) of Newport, Vermont.  She was known as Frances, and they were the parents of two children.

References

Sources

Books

Magazines

Newspapers

Internet

1912 births
1992 deaths
People from Brattleboro, Vermont
Norwich University alumni
Harvard Law School alumni
United States Army personnel of World War II
Vermont lawyers
Vermont state court judges
Republican Party members of the Vermont House of Representatives
Republican Party Vermont state senators
Vermont Attorneys General
United States Army officers
20th-century American politicians
20th-century American judges
20th-century American lawyers